David Aldarondo (born October 12, 1969) is an American politician who served in the Connecticut House of Representatives from the 75th district from 2005 to 2013.

References

1969 births
Living people
Democratic Party members of the Connecticut House of Representatives
People from Aguadilla, Puerto Rico